Niall Mark Blair (born 22 May 1977) is a former Australian politician and was the former Deputy Leader of the New South Wales Nationals. Blair was a Nationals member of the New South Wales Legislative Council from March 2011 until October 2019, when he retired from politics.

He was the New South Wales  Minister for Primary Industries from April 2015 until March 2019; the Minister for Trade and Industry and the Minister for Regional Water from January 2017 until March 2019 in the Berejiklian government.

Biography
Blair graduated with a Bachelor of Applied Science from the University of Western Sydney in 1997. He was a tree management officer with Marrickville Council from 1998 until 1999 and manager of parks and recreation for Leeton Shire from 1999 until 2005. He attained a masters in occupational health and safety from the University of Newcastle in 2005, and subsequently worked as manager of technical training for Integral Energy from 2005 until 2006. He founded a Moss Vale workplace safety consultancy, Admire Workplace Safety, in 2006 and was its CEO until his election to parliament in 2011.

Blair has been the chairman of the Nationals' Goulburn State Electoral Council since 2008, and was the Vice-Chairman of the Hume Federal Electoral Council from 2009 until 2010. He was preselected in April 2010 as the tenth candidate on the Coalition Legislative Council ticket, and was easily elected in March 2011 as the Coalition swept to a near-record landslide victory.

Following the 2015 state election, Blair was sworn in as the Minister for Primary Industries and the Minister for Lands and Water in the second Baird government. In January 2017 Blair was sworn in as the Minister for Primary Industries, the Minister for Trade and Industry, and the Minister for Regional Water in the Berejiklian government.

Blair was re-elected to the Legislative Council at the 2019 state election on 23 March, but the next day announced his resignation from the Cabinet, and from the Legislative Council when a replacement could be found. After the Nationals confirmed Sam Farraway as a replacement in September, Blair resigned from the Legislative Council on 16 October 2019.

Blair did not renew his National Party membership in 2020.

See also

Second Baird ministry
Berejiklian ministry

References

 

|-

 

 

1977 births
Living people
National Party of Australia members of the Parliament of New South Wales
Members of the New South Wales Legislative Council
Western Sydney University alumni
Australian people of Northern Ireland descent
People from Goulburn
University of Newcastle (Australia) alumni
21st-century Australian politicians